Clonkeen Church is a medieval church and a National Monument in County Limerick, Ireland.

Location

History

A monastery was founded here by Saint Mo-Diomog (feast day 10 December) in the 6th or 7th century.  The present church dates to the mid-12th century (based on its similarity to Aghadoe Cathedral, dated to 1158).

The church was ruined by 1657.

Church

Clonkeen Church is a small rectangular church with antae at the east and west ends. The west part of the church, incorporating the west doorway is Romanesque, built of roughly coursed large stones, mostly sandstone. It has a well-preserved doorway with an arch of three orders, with Romanesque carving around the jambs.

The capitals and columns with chevrons are similar to those at Aghadoe.

References

Religion in County Limerick
Archaeological sites in County Limerick
National Monuments in County Limerick
Former churches in the Republic of Ireland